CheShift-2  (pronounced /tʃeʃɪft/) is an application created to compute 13Cα and 13Cβ protein chemical shifts and to validate protein structures. It is based on quantum mechanics computations of 13Cα and 13Cβchemical shift as a function of the torsional angles (φ, ψ, ω and χ1, χ2) of the 20 amino acids.

CheShift-2 can return a list of theoretical chemical shift values from a PDB file. It also can display a 3D protein model based on an uploaded PDB file and chemical shift values. The 3D protein model is colored using a five color code indicating the differences of the theoretical vs the observed chemical shifts values. The differences between observed and predicted 13Cα and 13Cβ chemical shifts can be used as a sensitive probe with which to detect possible local flaws in protein structures. 
If both 13Cα and 13Cβ observed chemical shifts are provided CheShift-2 will attempt to provide a list of alternative χ1 and χ2 side-chain torsional angles that will reduce the differences between observed and computed chemical shifts, these values can be used to repair flaws in protein structures.

CheShift-2 can be accessed online at http://www.cheshift.com, or via PyMOL plugin.

See also
 Structure validation
 Bioinformatics
 Computational biology

Related software
 WHAT IF software
 PROCHECK
 PSVS

External links
 
 CheShift PyMOL plugin
 GitHub repository

References 

Bioinformatics software